Galy Records is a Canadian independent record label based in Verdun, Quebec, founded by Eric Galy in 2002. The label includes albums released for bands such as Dead Brain Cells, Neuraxis, Despised Icon, Gorguts, Unexpect, Infernäl Mäjesty, Anvil, Beneath the Massacre, Coprofago, Ion Dissonance, Martyr, Anonymus, Fuck the Facts and Infected Malignity.

Catalog

References
General

  Note: User must navigate to Pop > Label, and enter "Galy" in text box; Select first search result.
  Note: User must type "Galy" on the field LABEL.

Specific

External links 
 Galy Records official website

Heavy metal record labels
Quebec record labels
Record labels established in 2002
Canadian independent record labels
2002 establishments in Quebec